Muhammad Rafif Putra Adri (born 25 February 1999) is an Indonesian footballer who currently plays as a midfielder for Sriwijaya.

References

1999 births
Living people
Indonesian footballers
Association football midfielders
Sriwijaya F.C. players